Petrobius maritimus, the shore bristletail or sea bristletail, is a species of Archaeognatha found on rocky shores from the Mediterranean Sea to the North Sea .

Individuals may grow up to 15 mm and are grey in colour, with long bristly antennae and a triple forked tail .

They are very resistant to low temperatures, and remains active even if the temperature drops below 0 degrees C.

References

Archaeognatha
Insects of Europe
Insects described in 1809